People with the name Charles Burgess include:
Charles Frederick Burgess, an American chemist and engineer
Charles Burgess (cricketer), an English cricketer
Charles Burgess (footballer), a Scottish footballer
C. B. Fry, an English sportsman